Carl Stone (born Carl Joseph Stone, February 10, 1953) is an American composer, primarily working in the field of live electronic music.  His works have been performed in the United States, Canada, Europe, Asia, Australia, South America, and the Near East.

Biography
From 1966-9 he formed a band with Z'EV and James Stewart, performing jazz rock. After auditioning for Frank Zappa's Bizarre Records, the band ceased activities and both he and Z'EV went on to attend CalArts.

Stone studied composition at the California Institute of the Arts with Morton Subotnick and James Tenney and has composed electro-acoustic music almost exclusively since 1972.

Stone utilizes a laptop computer as his primary instrument and his works often feature very slowly developing manipulations of samples of acoustic music, speech, or other sounds.  Because of this, as well as his preference for tonal melodic and harmonic materials similar to those used in popular musics, Stone's work has been associated with the movement known as minimalism.

Prior to his settling on the laptop, in the 1980s, he created a number of electronic and collage works utilizing various electronic equipment as well as turntables. Prominent works from this period include  Dong Il Jang (1982) and Shibucho (1984), both of which subjected a wide variety of appropriated musical materials (e.g. Okinawan folk song, European Renaissance music, 1960s Motown, etc.) to fragmentation and looping. In this way his work paralleled innovations being made in the early days of rap and hip hop (e.g. Grandmaster Flash, of whose work he was unaware at the time). It was during this period that he began naming many of his works after his favorite restaurants (often Asian ones).

His first residency in Japan, sponsored by the Asian Cultural Council, was from November 1988 to April 1989. While living in Tokyo he collected more than 50 hours of recordings of the city's urban soundscape, which he later used as the basis for his radio composition Kamiya Bar, sponsored by Tokyo FM radio, and released on a CD of the same name by the Italian label NewTone / Robi Droli.

Stone has collaborated frequently with Asian performers, including traditional instrumentalists such as Min Xiao-Fen (pipa), Yumiko Tanaka (shamisen), Kazue Sawai (koto), Michiko Akao (ryuteki), and those working with modern instruments, such as Otomo Yoshihide (turntables, guitar), Kazuhisa Uchihashi (guitar, daxophone), Yuji Takahashi (computer, piano), and vocalists such as Reisu Saki and Haco. He has also collaborated on an album with Hirohito Ihara's Radicalfashion with Alfred Harth who partly lives in Korea, and with Miki Yui who lives in Düsseldorf.

Beginning in the early years of the 21st century, Stone began to compose more frequently for acoustic instruments and ensembles, completing a new work for the San Francisco Bay Area-based American Baroque.

Stone served as president of the American Music Center from 1992 to 1995, and was director of Meet the Composer/California from 1981 to 1997.  He also served as music director of KPFK-FM in Los Angeles from 1978 to 1981.

For many years, Stone has divided his time between California and Japan.

Stone received a 1999 Foundation for Contemporary Arts Grants to Artists Award.

Works

Solo recordings
 Wat Dong Moon Lek (May 2022)
 Namidabashi (2021) - digital only release, part of the Displacing series, on Touch
Stolen Car (2020)
 Al Noor (2007) – Explorations into the dismantling and re-composition of global song and melody
 Nak Won (2002) – Real-time music for laptop computer
 Resonator (2002) – Soundtrack for the works of sculptor Seiji Kunishima
 Exusiai (1998, released 1999) – Music for contemporary dancer Akira Kasai
 em:t 1196 (1996) – The musical part of a three-way collaboration between the composer, dancer Kuniko Kisanuki and sculptor Satoru Shoji
 Kamiya Bar (1995) – Excerpts from a sound collage assembled in 1992 from TV commercials and field recordings made in Tokyo in the late 1980s
 Mom’s (1992) 
 Four Pieces (1989) – Playful explorations and transformations for Macintosh computer 
 Wave-Heat (1983) – Piece for digital delay/harmonizer and an LP record; released on audio cassette
 Woo Lae Oak (1981, released 1983; re-issued 2008 as a single continuous track) – A concrete symphony for the tremolo of a rubbed string and the tone of a blown bottle

Some unreleased recordings
Torung (1983) – Piece for Synclavier
Maneeya (1973) – Piece for tape
Plastics (1972) –  Film soundtrack

Other released collaborations
Realistic Monk, (2015 - present) collaboration with sound artist Miki Yui

Pict.soul (2000–2001) – Long-distance collaboration with Tetsu Inoue

Monogatari: Amino Argot (1994) – Long-distance collaboration with Otomo Yoshihide

Over-Ring-Under (1992) – Soundtrack to a videogame CD-ROM, with visual artist Teckon

Other commissioned works
Luong Hai Ky Mi Gia (2001) – DVD-Audio/Video piece for 5.1 surround sound system; commissioned by Starkland
Sa Rit Gol (1997) – Piece for disklavier and pianist; commissioned by Bay Area Pianists and Cal Performances, as part of the Henry Cowell Centennial Celebration at UC Berkeley
The Noh Project (1996) – A collaboration with choreographer June Watanabe and Noh master Anshin Uchida
Yam Vun Sen (1995) – Network duel piece for the internet; commissioned by NTT as part of IC95 Festival, Tokyo
Sudi Mampir (1995) – Contribution to compilation album "em:t 5595"
Banh Mi So (1994) – Piece for ondes martenot and piano; commissioned by Takashi Harada and Aki Takahashi
Mae Ploy (1994) – Piece for String Quartet and computer accompanist; commissioned by the Strings Plus Festival, Kobe, for the Smith Quartet
Lumpinee (1993) – Installation for computer-operated MIDI system; commissioned by the Museum of Contemporary Art, Los Angeles for the exhibition "John Cage: Rolywholyover: A Circus"
Du Pars (1993) – Soundtrack for interactive laserdisk "L.A. Journal", produced by Voyager
Ruen Pair (1993) – Piece for electronic chamber ensemble; commissioned by the Paul Dresher Ensemble
Rezukuja (1991) – Piece for bass marimba and electronics; commissioned by Sumire Yoshihara
She Gol Jib (1991) – Piece for ryuteki (flute) and electronics; commissioned by Michiko Akao
Recurring Cosmos (1991) – Piece for High Definition video and electronics, including Banteay Srey; commissioned by Sony PCL
Made in Hollywood (1990) – Soundtrack music; commissioned by ZDF Television, Germany
Thonburi (1989) – Part of the radio series "Territory of Art"
Spalding Gray's Map of L.A. (1987) – Soundtrack for videotape produced and directed by Bruce and Norman Yonemoto
Vault (1984) – Soundtrack for videotape produced and directed by Bruce and Norman Yonemoto
Mae Yao (1984) – Piece for live electronics, multiple bagpipes and pipe organ; commissioned by The Art of Spectacle Festival
Se Jong (1983) – Piece for tape; commissioned by the 1984 Olympic Arts Festival as part of the radio series "Sounds In Motion"

References

Reviews 

 The Wire Top Ten 2020, Stolen Car
 Artforum, Best of 2019, Himalaya
 Bandcamp,  Best Experimental Albums of 2019, Himalaya and Baroo
 Pitchfork, Best Experimental Albums of 2019, Baroo
 The Wire Best of 2019, Himalaya
 The Wire Best of 2019, Baroo
 The Wire full review Himalaya

External links
Official website
Deep algebra for deep beats: The beautiful sounds of musical programming, ArsTechnica 2020
Tone Glow 032.6: Carl Stone 2020
UNA CONVERSACIÓN CON CARL STONE, Luca 2021
Lecture, Harvey Mudd College Nelson Speaker Series, 2012
Lecture Presentation, Carl Stone at TEDxTheWebbSchools, 2013
Fifteen Questions Interview with Carl Stone
Carl Stone :: The Aquarium Drunkard Interview, 2018
15 Questions to Carl Stone, 2013
Golden, Barbara. “Conversation with Carl Stone.” eContact! 12.2 — Interviews (2) (April 2010). Montréal: CEC.
O’Toole, Owen. “Carl Stone Interview.” Interview from 27 August 2009, La Brea Farmers Market. Underminds, 17 December 2009.
Taylor, Gregory. “An Interview With Carl Stone.” Cycling 74, 13 September 2005.
webSYNradio. “websynradio – programmed by Carl Stone.” podcast available, 18–25 March 2010.
Burns, Todd. "Charting Carl Stone's Musical Evolution: Sampling the Sacred and Profane." Red Bull Music Academy Daily, 5 December 2016.

Listening
 surround sound recording of Luong Hai Ky Mi Gia, commissioned by Starkland
  at SASSAS

1953 births
Living people
20th-century classical composers
21st-century classical composers
American male classical composers
American classical composers
Asian Cultural Council grantees
21st-century American composers
20th-century American composers
20th-century American male musicians
21st-century American male musicians